Ken Hechtman (born December 16, 1967) is a freelance journalist and convicted drug dealer from Canada who achieved brief international prominence in late 2001 when Afghanistan's Taliban government charged him with being a United States spy while he researched a story for the Montreal Mirror. Afghanistan tried, acquitted, and released him after a short time in jail.

He attended Columbia University, and was expelled his freshman year for stealing uranium-238 from the university's former Manhattan Project laboratories. He married fellow Montrealer and journalist Wendy Hechtman on September 12, 2015. They moved to Nebraska in February 2016.

Criminal charges 
According to police investigators, Hechtman and his wife Wendy invented a pastel-colored version of carfentanil, an opioid that can be up to 10,000 times more powerful than morphine and that can kill a human with only a few grains touching human skin. Hechtman and Wendy allegedly "developed a sophisticated marketing system with a sales team of about 40 people."

Kenneth and Wendy were charged with conspiracy to manufacture 10 grams or more of fentanyl analogue, conspiracy to distribute a fentanyl analogue, and possession with intent to distribute 400 grams or more of a fentanyl analogue between on or about March 2017 and October 30, 2017. They pleaded guilty, and were both sentenced to 15 years in federal prison in 2018.

References

Bibliography
Lisa Birnbach's New and Improved College Book, by Lisa Birnbach (1992) 
Montreal Mirror, message from the editor, December 2001

External links
 A Pravda report on Hechtman's captivity in Afghanistan.
 A CBC story about Hechtman and the Taliban.
 Ken Hechtman's Taliban story for the Montreal Mirror.
 A Columbia Spectator article.
 A Columbia Spectator article.
 An article by The Blue and White, Columbia University's undergraduate magazine
 The Montreal Mirror 25th anniversary tribute to Ken
United States v. Hechtman (8:17-cr-00336), United States District Court, D. Nebraska

1960s births
Living people
Canadian journalists
Prisoners of the Taliban
Canadian people imprisoned abroad
Jewish Canadian journalists
Columbia College (New York) alumni